I Am Terrified is an American post-hardcore band originating from Birmingham, Alabama.

The band was signed to Gotee Records and toured to promote their self-titled debut EP, I Am Terrified.

History

The band was formed as Fixed Til Tuesday in Birmingham by guitarist Jeremy Folse, vocalist Patrick Schefano, and drummer Joel Bailey by knowing each other from local schools and churches. Influenced both by the sound of church hymns and hardcore rock, the three formed the band and released an independent EP, Aww Son.

After much consideration and new thinking, Fixed Til Tuesday changed their name to I Am Terrified sometime between 2006 and 2010. The name comes straight from the verse in the Bible's Book of Job 23:14-15 which reads, "He carries out His decree against me, and many such plans He still has in store. That is why I am terrified before Him; when I think of all this, I fear Him." As guitarist Jeremy Folse explained they changed the name because they became driven "by the desire to give God straight-up worship, and to show the love of Christ to every kid we can possibly reach".

The band was signed in 2007 to Mono Vs Stereo Records and began work on their debut EP. When Mono Vs Stereo was put on hiatus by its parent company Gotee Records, the band was transferred to Gotee's roster. I Am Terrified was released on July 18, 2008, and then re-released on July 29, 2008.

Members 
Current
Patrick "Paddy" Schefano - vocals
Brandon Henderson - guitar
Joel Bailey - drums
Gabe Rosser guitar
John Ball bass guitar

Past members

Logan Freeman rhythm guitar
Matthew Stagner - bass guitar
Dustin Carter bass guitar
Jeremy Folse guitar
Devin Smith (First Servant, the band's name previous to Fixed Til Tuesday) bass guitar
Daniel Nelems (Fixed Til Tuesday) bass guitar
Eric Anderton bass guitar
Mark Lucas  drums

Discography 

Aww Son (as "Fixed Til Tuesday", 2006)
I Am Terrified (EP, 2008)

See also

 List of Mono Vs Stereo artists
 List of Gotee Records artists
 Music of Alabama

References

External links 
 I Am Terrified on Myspace
 

2004 establishments in Alabama
2010 disestablishments in Alabama
American screamo musical groups
Heavy metal musical groups from Alabama
Musical groups disestablished in 2010
Musical groups established in 2004
Musical quartets
Gotee Records artists
Musical groups from Birmingham, Alabama